The Savannah Historic District is a large urban U.S. historic district that roughly corresponds to the pre-civil war city limits of Savannah, Georgia. The area was declared a National Historic Landmark District in 1966, and is one of the largest urban, community-wide historic preservation districts in the United States. The district was made in recognition of the Oglethorpe Plan, a unique sort of urban planning begun by James Oglethorpe at the city's founding and propagated for the first century of its growth.

The plan of the historic portions of Savannah is based on the concept of a ward, as defined by James Oglethorpe. Each ward had a central square, around which were arrayed four trust lots and four tythings. Each trust lot was to be used for a civic purpose, such as a school, government building, church, museum, or other public venue, while the tythings were each subdivided into ten lots for residential use.  The wards were oriented in a rectilinear grid with north–south and east–west alignment. In a typical ward, the trust lots were set east and west of the square, and the residential lots of the tythings were extended north and south of the trust lots and the square, each tything divided into two rows of five lots, separated by alleys. In the early years of the Province of Georgia, the ward organization was in part military, with each ward's inhabitants organized into militia units, and the central squares acting as a gathering point for refugees from outside the city walls.

Each year, the Savannah Historic District attracts millions of visitors, who enjoy its eighteenth- and nineteenth-century architecture and green spaces. The district includes the birthplace of Juliette Gordon Low (founder of the Girl Scouts of the United States of America, see Juliette Gordon Low Historic District), the Telfair Academy of Arts and Sciences (one of the South's first public museums),  the First African Baptist Church (the oldest African American Baptist congregation in the United States), Temple Mickve Israel (the third-oldest synagogue in America), the Central of Georgia Railway roundhouse complex (the oldest standing antebellum rail facility in America), Christ Church (the Mother Church of Georgia), the old Colonial Cemetery, Cathedral of St. John the Baptist, Old Harbor Light, and Factors Row, a line of former cotton warehouses, along its waterfront, some built from ships' ballast stones.

Other buildings in the district include the Isaiah Davenport House, the Green-Meldrim House, the Owens–Thomas House, the William Scarbrough House, the Sorrel–Weed House, and the United States Customhouse. Notable green spaces in the district include Savannah's 22 squares, the 30-acre Forsyth Park (at the southern limit of the district), and Emmet Park, part of The Strand, near the city's riverfront, in what was known as the Old Fort neighborhood.

Gallery

See also
Savannah Victorian Historic District
Points of interest in Savannah, Georgia
List of National Historic Landmarks in Georgia
National Register of Historic Places listings in Chatham County, Georgia

References

External links
 
 
Search for Savannah GA photosets here, at Historic American Buildings Survey
Official Savannah info regards the district

National Historic Landmarks in Savannah, Georgia
Geography of Savannah, Georgia
Historic districts on the National Register of Historic Places in Georgia (U.S. state)
National Register of Historic Places in Savannah, Georgia